Kelly Fisher (born 25 August 1978) is an English professional pool, snooker and English billiards player.

Career
Fisher grew up in South Elmsall, near Pontefract, West Yorkshire. She learned to play pool in her parents' pub and took up snooker when she was 13. By the age of 21, she had been ranked No. 1 for two consecutive seasons.

Fisher won three successive  Ladies World Snooker Championship between 1998 and 2000, and won the title again in 2002 and 2003.

In 2001, she won four successive tournaments in the ladies' divisions – the British Open, Belgian Open, LG Cup titles and the UK Championship, and extended her winning streak to ten successive tournaments when she won the LG Cup in October 2002.

She has reached the final of every European Ladies' Championship, losing just once to former West Yorkshire (Batley) champion  Shakeel Kamal. In 2003 Fisher won the first IBSF World Ladies' Championship.

When the sport's governing body withdrew its support for the women's game in 2003, abandoning all major women tournaments, Fisher saw her choices as getting a full-time job or switching to nine-ball pool. She chose to switch to pool and moved to the United States to play on the Women's Professional Billiard Association (WPBA Tour), joining fellow former women's snooker players Allison Fisher and Karen Corr.

After being in the top 10 women players for two years, and winning the San Diego Classic for three years running (2005–2007), Fisher achieved the No. 1 ranking in world women's pool in August 2008, winning the US Open Championship. Since then, she has gone on to win the women's divisions in the 2009 International Tournament of Champions and U.S. Open 9-Ball Championship; the 2011 World Ten-ball Championship; 2012 WPA Nine-ball World Championship (and WPA Player of the Year), among other titles.

Tournament wins
All are first-place wins, in women's divisions, unless otherwise noted.

Snooker

 Home Internationals (with team England) 2002 and 2003

English billiards

Pool

References

External links 
 Player profile at Women's Professional Billiard Association
 Player profile at AZBilliards
 Chris Turner's Snooker Archive: Ladies' Snooker
 Kelly Fisher's What's in the Case? video by Inside POOL Magazine

1978 births
Living people
English players of English billiards
English snooker players
English pool players
Female players of English billiards
Female pool players
Female snooker players
People from South Elmsall
Sportspeople from West Yorkshire
World Games gold medalists
World Games bronze medalists
Competitors at the 2013 World Games
Competitors at the 2022 World Games
World champions in English billiards